Omoglymmius strabus is a species of beetle in the subfamily Rhysodidae. It was described by Edward Newman in 1838.

References

strabus
Beetles described in 1838